3800 Degrees is a mixtape by American rapper YoungBoy Never Broke Again. It was released through Never Broke Again & Atlantic Records on October 7, 2022. The album features guest appearances from E-40, Mouse on tha Track, and Shy Glizzy. The mixtape is thought to pay homage to Juvenile's 1998 400 Degreez and Lil Wayne's 2002 500 Degreez. YoungBoy's in-house producer Jason "Cheese" Goldberg mixed, mastered, and engineered every track on the mixtape. The album also features production from many prestigious producers such as Drum Dummie, JahDaGod, Leor Shevah, TayTayMadeIt, and Wheezy. The mixtape marks his fourth solo project in 2022, as well as his fifth overall.

Background
In September 2022, Youngboy Never Broke Again released the mixtape Realer 2, which peaked at number 6 on the Billboard 200. He announced the release of 3800 Degrees, his third project released in 2 months, via his YouTube channel stating, "To whom stabbed me in my back laughing like me being counted out funny—it's all good." On Instagram he added, "I just need everyone to go against me, I need the energy."

Artwork
The artwork is presented as a pin and pixel old-school cover art, paying homage to the artwork of Juvenile's 400 Degreez. It shows YoungBoy in front of the Horace Wilkinson Bridge while gripping several chains, all while surrounded by fire. Street signs for Chippewa St & N 38th St can also be seen, paying homage to YoungBoy's hometown.

Critical reception

3800 Degrees received generally positive reviews from critics. Paul Simpson from AllMusic stated that "[3800 Degrees] sounds like it could've come out on Cash Money circa 2000." The review was concluded as Simpson stated that the mixtape consists "of concise, aggressive blasts of energy," and "is one of YoungBoy's more potent efforts." Nadine Smith from Pitchfork wrote that "3800 Degrees is more concise than many of YoungBoy's frequently meandering albums. With its compact style and classic sound, it is more critic-friendly and more appealing to old head haters." Smith felt that while "He's not always fast or especially clever in his wordplay", "YoungBoy's bars are frequently dense, delivered with an almost demonic energy; he crams his words into spaces where other rappers might need a breath." Concluding the review, Smith noted, "3800 Degrees is a culmination of—and a direct statement about—his ethos as an artist and individual. The surface may change, but the hustle at the heart of it all is timeless."

Raphael Helfand of The Fader noted that while the mixtape is "far from Youngboy's most impressive project to date", it proves that the rapper can release a better project a month "than most could make in a year".

Year-end lists

Commercial performance
3800 Degrees debuted at number twelve on the US Billboard 200 chart, earning 24,437 album-equivalent units (including 443 copies in pure album sales) in its first week.

Track listing

Personnel
Credits adapted from Tidal.

 Jason "Cheese" Goldberg – mastering, mixing, recording (6, 11, 13), additional engineer (1-5, 7-10, 12)
 Khris James – mastering, mixing, recording (1–5, 7-10, 12)

Charts

References

2022 mixtape albums
Atlantic Records albums
YoungBoy Never Broke Again albums
Albums produced by Wheezy